Wayne Morris (born May 3, 1954) is a former college and professional football player.

Early life and high school
Morris was born and raised in Dallas, Texas. In 1972, Morris graduated from South Oak Cliff High School (SOC), where he starred at defensive back and running back. A 1981 D Magazine article chose Morris as one of the best football players to ever come out of a Dallas high school. As the article asserted, "When Wayne Morris was at SOC in the early Seventies, he was the best all-around high school football player in Texas. As a junior he made second-team all-state on defense; as a senior he made first-team all-state on offense."

College football
In college, Morris was a freshman starter at Southern Methodist University, where he starred at running back. As Dan Jenkins wrote in Sports Illustrated during Morris's freshman year, "Wayne Morris is already being pronounced the greatest thing to come to the school (SMU) since Doak Walker." Morris went on to rush for over 3000 yards during his college career.

Professional football
Morris was selected in the 5th round of the 1976 NFL Draft by the Cardinals. He also played for the Chargers during his 8 years in the NFL. During his NFL career, Morris ran for 3,387 yards on 899 attempts, scoring 38 rushing touchdowns. He also caught 156 passes for 1,190 yards and 5 receiving touchdowns.

After football
He currently resides in Dallas and is single and has one daughter.

References

1954 births
Living people
Players of American football from Dallas
American football running backs
SMU Mustangs football players
St. Louis Cardinals (football) players
San Diego Chargers players